The History of a Crime (1877) is an essay by Victor Hugo about Napoleon III's takeover of France.

External links 
  (Translated by T.H. Joyce and Arthur Locker.)

1877 works
Works by Victor Hugo